The 2007–08 season was Stoke City's 101st in the Football League, the 41st in the second tier and fourth in the Championship.

After last season's narrow miss on a play-off, the objective was to gain an automatic promotion position. But after a poor summer transfer wise supporters wondered what the ambition of the club was. New signings were unknown youngster Ryan Shawcross signed on loan from Manchester United and veteran forward Richard Cresswell, which hardly set the pulses racing but a 1–0 win on the opening match of the season at Cardiff City set the tone for a season to remember. Stoke didn't really perform well in the opening few months and by the middle of November they were in mid-table, but several key loan signings saw Stoke embark on a twelve match unbeaten run.

This pushed Stoke into the top two and after a narrow defeat at Charlton Athletic Stoke won five in a row. However Stoke then hit a poor run of form winning one in their next eight matches. Wins over Coventry City, Bristol City and Colchester United saw Stoke within one point of gaining a promotion, which they would achieve after drawing 0–0 with Leicester City to gain a long-awaited return to the top flight of English football after a 23-year absence.

Season review

League
The feeling around the club had improved after last season's success in finishing 8th. The supporters were hoping that the management would bring new quality players as well as making last season's successful loan players moves permanent. But the club were left frustrated as most decided to seek employment elsewhere and by the time the start of the season had come around Stoke had only added Richard Cresswell, Jon Parkin and Ryan Shawcross to their squad. Stoke's first match of the season saw them travel to notoriously hostile Ninian Park to take on Cardiff City. Debutante Ryan Shawcross made a perfect start to his Stoke career scoring the winning goal in a 1–0 win which saw Steve Simonsen save a last minute penalty. A good win against promotion favourites Charlton Athletic followed but a 3–2 defeat at Southampton brought Stoke their first defeat of the season. Three draws against Wolverhampton Wanderers, Hull City and Barnsley failed to get the supporters excited and during the next match against Plymouth Argyle with Stoke 2–1 down, some fans started venting their frustrations at manager Tony Pulis but Stoke went on to win 3–2.

Stoke began to struggle, with poor home defeats to Sheffield Wednesday and then Coventry City prompted Pulis to enter the loan market again and he brought in Leon Cort and Danny Pugh. This enabled Stoke to field a more settled side and they began to display the form they showed from last season and they went twelve matches unbeaten from 24 November 2007 to 19 January 2008. During that run Stoke gained some impressive victories including a 3–0 at Sheffield United and a Ricardo Fuller hat trick against promotion rivals West Bromwich Albion. In the January transfer window Stoke completed the permanent signings of Cort, Pugh and Shawcross whilst former players Andy Griffin and Paul Gallagher made a return and John Eustace joined Watford with Glenn Whelan joining as a replacement.

Stoke's twelve match unbeaten run was ended with a 1–0 defeat away at Charlton Athletic. Stoke bounced back brilliantly beating Cardiff 2–1 and Wolverhampton Wanderers 4–2 away at Molineux. Then they beat both Southampton and Scunthorpe United 3–2 and made it five wins in a row with a 1–0 win over Ipswich Town to earn Pulis manager of the month award for February. But Stoke lost their form and managed just one win in their next eight matches until they won against Coventry City with three matches remaining. A Mamady Sidibé double helped Stoke beat promotion rivals Bristol City and ended their efforts to gain automatic promotion leaving just Stoke and Hull fighting for 2nd place with West Bromwich Albion looking to have sealed top spot. For the penultimate match of the season Stoke travelled to Colchester United who had already being relegated. However it was not an easy match as Colchester were playing their final match at Layer Road, Cresswell scored the only goal as Stoke almost secured promotion but for a late winner for Hull. This took the promotion race to the final match of the season against relegation threatened Leicester City. In a tense and cagey 90 minutes the scored remained goalless and Stoke took the point they needed to gain promotion to the Premier League and a return to the top flight of English football for 23 years.

FA Cup
Stoke drew struggling Premier League side Newcastle United in the third round, the match ended in a goalless draw with Stoke creating the better chances. In the replay Newcastle had appointed Kevin Keegan as manager and he inspired the "Magpies" to a 4–1 victory.

League Cup
For a fourth season in a row Stoke made a first round exit to League Two opposition this time to Rochdale, losing 4–2 on penalties after a 2–2 in normal and extra time.

Final league table

Results

Stoke's score comes first

Legend

Pre-season friendlies

Football League Championship

FA Cup

League Cup

Squad statistics

Transfers

In

Loan in

Out

References

Stoke City F.C. seasons
Stoke City